Luis Mariano Santos Reyero (born 1969) is a Spanish politician who is the Secretary General of the Leonese People's Union. He was the party's sole representative elected to the Cortes of Castile and León in 2015 and 2019, and one of three elected in 2022.

Biography
Born in Cistierna, Province of León, he graduated in Political Sciences from the Complutense University of Madrid and has a Master's degree in Human Resources. As of 2015, he had been a councillor in his hometown for 12 years. In March 2015, he was chosen as his party's list leader for the Castilian-Leonese regional election in May, having previously been number 2 to Alejandro Valderas. He was his party's only elected representative. Four years later, he repeated the feat. In the 2022 election, the party rose to three deputies, matching 1999 as its best result.

While he and his party support León being a separate autonomous community to Castile, Santos has rejected accusations from the People's Party and Citizens that he supports full independence: "we are pro-constitution, Spanish and Leonese". The UPL's prospective region comprises the provinces of León, Zamora and Salamanca.

References

1969 births
Living people
People from the Province of León
Complutense University of Madrid alumni
Leaders of political parties in Spain
Members of the 9th Cortes of Castile and León
Members of the 10th Cortes of Castile and León
Members of the 11th Cortes of Castile and León
21st-century Spanish politicians